Duke Xuan of Qi (died 405 BC) was from 455 to 405 BC the titular ruler of the State of Qi during the transition from the Spring and Autumn to the Warring States period of ancient China.  His personal name was Lü Ji (呂積), ancestral name Jiang (姜), and Duke Xuan was his posthumous title.

Reign
Duke Xuan succeeded his father, Duke Ping of Qi, who died in 456 BC after 25 years of reign as titular ruler of Qi.  Since Tian Heng killed Duke Xuan's uncle Duke Jian in 481 BC, Tian had effectively ruled the State of Qi.  Tian Heng died soon after Duke Xuan's accession, and was succeeded by his son Tian Pan as Prime Minister and de facto ruler.

Duke Xuan ruled for 51 years and went through four generations of Tian leaders.  After Tian Pan's death, Tian Bai succeeded his father.  Qi attacked the State of Jin in 413 BC and the State of Lu the next year.  Tian Bai died in 411 BC and his son Tian Daozi became leader of the Tian clan and de facto ruler of Qi.  In 408 BC, Qi attacked Lu again, taking the city of Cheng.  The following year, Qi invaded the State of Wey and annexed the city of Guanqiu.

Succession
In 405 BC, Duke Xuan died and was succeeded by his son, Duke Kang of Qi, who would become the last ruler of the House of Jiang.  In 386 BC Tian He would be formally declared Duke of Qi, ending more than six centuries of rule by the House of Jiang.

Family
Sons:
 Prince Dai (d. 379 BC), ruled as Duke Kang of Qi from 404–386 BC

Ancestry

References

Year of birth unknown
Monarchs of Qi (state)
5th-century BC Chinese monarchs
405 BC deaths